Eric Fraser may refer to:

 Eric Malcolm Fraser (1896–1960), Director-General at the British Ministry of Aircraft Production during the Second World War
 Eric Fraser (Canadian football) (born 1987), Canadian footballer
 Eric Fraser (illustrator) (1902–1983), British illustrator and graphic artist
 Eric Fraser (rugby league) (1931–2000), rugby league footballer